This is a list of Gujarati language films that are released in 2019. Chaal Jeevi Laiye! became the highest-grossing Gujarati film of all time, earning

Box-office collection

January–March

April–June

July–September

October–December

References

External links
 List of Gujarati films of 2019 at the Internet Movie Database

2019
Gujarati
Gujarati